Barry Hovis (born 1964 or 1965) is an American politician. He is a member of the Missouri House of Representatives from the 146th District, serving since 2019. He is a member of the Republican party.

References

Living people
1960s births
Republican Party members of the Missouri House of Representatives
21st-century American politicians